Francisca Wieser, also known as Frances A. Wieser, or Francesca Wieser ( – ) was an American scientific illustrator, drafter, artist, and photographic assistant. She worked for the United States Geological Survey, and the United States National Museum (now the National Museum of Natural History) from 1911 to 1929 with the title of "paleontologic draftsman". She was known for her drawings of fossils.

Biography 
She was the daughter of German immigrants, her mother was Sophia Ailer (née Seitz), and her father was a war veteran (1st Maryland Cavalry in the Union Army during the American Civil War) and a visual artist, Louis Wieser (1836–1904). Her younger sister Florence Wieser (1877–1949) also worked as an illustrator and artist at the United States Geological Survey. From early childhood she had a love of creating art.

She served as an artist and illustrator to several departments and for several people, including Ray S. Bassler, and Charles Doolittle Walcott. Wieser used a combination of a microscope and drawing, camera lucida, to record fossils that were millions of years old, and was recognized for her ability to capture details of fossils by drawing rather than relying on photography.

Death and legacy 
Wieser died on January 15, 1949, in Washington, D.C. at St. Elizabeths Hospital, a psychiatric hospital where she was a resident.

In 1904, the Cythere francisca or C. francisca fossil was named in her honor by the Maryland Geological Survey. In 1911, Ray S. Bassler named the Sceptropora francisca or S. francisca fossil in her honor.

Publications

References 

Created via preloaddraft
1869 births
1949 deaths
Artists from Washington, D.C.
American illustrators
Burials at Glenwood Cemetery (Washington, D.C.)
American women illustrators
Scientific illustrators
Paleoartists
United States Geological Survey personnel
American people of German descent
20th-century American women artists